Sanjay Shamrao Dhotre (born 26 February 1959) is an Indian politician from the state of Maharashtra and formerly Minister of State in the Government of India and a member of the 17th Lok Sabha of India. He represents the Akola constituency of Maharashtra and is a member of the Bharatiya Janata Party (BJP) political party.

He was also a member of the 14th Lok Sabha, 15th Lok Sabha and 16th Lok Sabha between 2004 and 2019 from Akola.

Education and early career
Dhotre holds a Bachelor of Mechanical Engineering from the Government College of Engineering, Amravati. He graduated in 1981.

Career
In May 2019, Dhotre became Minister of State for Human Resource Development, Communications and Electronics and Information Technology.

Debate details in Lok Sabha
14-Jul-2014 (I) The Budget (Railways) – 2014-15 (II) Demands for Excess Grants (Railways) – 2011-12
14-Jul-2014 - Need to expedite the gauge conversion of the Ratlam-Fatehabad-Indore-Mhow-Khandwa-Amalakhurd-Akot-Akola Section
31-Jul-2014 - flood and drought situation in the country
11-Aug-2014 - The Railways (Amendment) Bill, 2024
25-Nov-2014 - Demand for recognizing Anganwadi workers as regular govt employees
11-Mar-2015 - The Budget (Railways) – 2015–16; (ii) Demands Grants on Account (Railways) – 2015–16; and (iii) Supplementary Demands for Grants (Railways) – 2014-15
19-Mar-2015 - Discussion on the agrarian situation in the country
22-Apr-2015 - Regarding not to scrap Handloom Reservation Act
Resignation from Modi Cabinet on Wednesday 7 July 2021

Positions held in Lok Sabha
5 Aug. 2004 and 5 Aug. 2007 - Aug. 2008 - Member, Committee on Information Technology
31 Aug. 2009 - Member, Committee on Rural Development
14 Aug. 2014 onwards - Member, Committee on Estimates
1 Sep. 2014 onwards - Member, Standing Committee on Railways
1 Sep. 2014 onwards - Member, Consultative Committee, Ministry of Agriculture
3 July 2015 onwards - Convenor, Sub Committee-III, Committee on Estimates

Legislative
Member, Maharashtra Legislative Assembly - 1999 to 2004
Elected for 14th Lok Sabha (First Term)  
Re-elected for 15th Lok Sabha (Second Term)15th Lok Sabha
Re-elected for 16th Lok Sabha (Third Term)
Re-elected for 17th Lok Sabha (Fourth Term)

Family and personal life
Sanjay Dhotre was married to Suhasini in 1983. They have two sons.

References

External links
 Official biographical sketch in Parliament of India website

Living people
1959 births
Bharatiya Janata Party politicians from Maharashtra
India MPs 2014–2019
India MPs 2009–2014
India MPs 2004–2009
India MPs 2019–present
Marathi politicians
People from Akola
Maharashtra MLAs 1999–2004
Lok Sabha members from Maharashtra
Narendra Modi ministry